Mark Bond may refer to:

Mark Bond, musician in the band De Novo Dahl
Mark Bond, see Freemen on the land#Court cases